"Chapter 2" is the second episode of the sixth season of the anthology television series American Horror Story. It aired on September 21, 2016, on the cable network FX. The episode was written by Tim Minear and directed by Michael Goi.

Plot
Shelby assumes the ritual she witnessed was staged, she flees from the mob and is almost hit by Lee's car. Shelby passes out in the middle of the road and awakes the next day in the hospital, she resolves to stay in the house.

Lee's ex-husband Mason brings their daughter Flora to visit as part of the couple's arranged custody schedule. As Flora explores the house, she begins talking to an unseen girl who she names Priscilla. Matt and Shelby experience more disturbing incidents, now involving a pair of ghostly nurses. After discovering a burning totem in the woods near the house, Matt and Shelby finally secured the help of the local police to take little interest.

Mason arrives to pick up Flora and finds her playing a game of hide and seek with Priscilla. Flora tells him that she offered her doll to Priscilla in exchange for not murdering her family, but since Mason interrupted the trade, Flora will merely be killed last. Mason takes Flora away from the house and promises Lee that she will never see her again, causing Lee to end her sobriety.

That night, Matt and Shelby discover a storm cellar under the backyard. There, they watched a videotape recorded by one of the house's previous owners, Dr. Elias Cunningham. Dr. Cunningham describes the same malevolent forces pursuing him that the couple has been experiencing and that he was studying the story of the nurses, Miranda and Bridget Jane. The sisters killed their retirement home patients based on the first letters of the victims' names, spelling the word "Murder".

The bank refuses to return the money they bought the house with, despite not warning them about the house's gruesome past. As the bank agent leaves, Lee arrives with Flora. While Shelby is distracted on the phone, Flora is beckoned outside by a mysterious figure. When the adults are not able to find Flora, they frantically search for her in the house and then in the woods, where they find Flora's hoodie hanging at the top of a massive pine tree.

Reception
"Chapter 2" was watched by 3.27 million people during its original broadcast, and gained a 1.8 ratings share among adults aged 18–49.

The episode received a 64% approval rating on Rotten Tomatoes, based on 14 reviews with an average score of 6.1/10. The critical consensus reads, "The tried and true premise that emerges in "Chapter 2" is undermined by superficial exposition that damages its credibility – even in the context of American Horror Story."

References

External links
 

American Horror Story: Roanoke episodes
Television episodes directed by Michael Goi
Television episodes written by Tim Minear